Orocrambus scoparioides is a moth in the family Crambidae. It was described by Alfred Philpott in 1914. It is endemic to New Zealand, where it has been recorded in the mountain ranges of Otago and Southland.

The wingspan is 13–16 mm for males and 14–20 mm for females. Adults have been recorded on wing from December to April.

References

Crambinae
Moths described in 1914
Moths of New Zealand
Endemic fauna of New Zealand
Endemic moths of New Zealand